Psilogramma hauensteini is a moth of the  family Sphingidae. It is known to Guizhou, China.

References

Psilogramma
Moths described in 2001
Endemic fauna of China